David Mark Greenwood (born March 25, 1960 in Park Falls, Wisconsin) is a former American football safety who played three seasons in the National Football League. Considered by many to be the greatest high school athlete in the history of Wisconsin, Greenwood excelled in track and basketball as well as football in high school. He still holds the Wisconsin prep high jump record (7'2") He went on to become a four-year starter at both safety and punter for the Wisconsin Badgers. Previously, he played in the United States Football League also as a punter for the Michigan Panthers and the Oakland Invaders. Before joining the USFL, he was expected to be a 1st-round-quality NFL draft pick, a strong hitter and blitzer who performed poorly at man-to-man coverage. He played in all 16 games for the Tampa Bay Buccaneers in 1985, starting 10, but was cut early in training camp the next year due to inconsistency. He blamed this on burnout, having started in the Buccaneers' season opener only one week after leaving the Invaders.

Awards
The Sporting News All-League Team, 1983

References

External links
NFL.com player page

1960 births
Living people
People from Park Falls, Wisconsin
Players of American football from Wisconsin
American football defensive backs
Wisconsin Badgers football players
Tampa Bay Buccaneers players
Green Bay Packers players
Los Angeles Raiders players
Michigan Panthers players
Oakland Invaders players